The Morane-Saulnier MS.755 Fleuret was a prototype French two-seat jet trainer designed and built by Morane-Saulnier. It failed to gain any orders but was developed into the larger four-seat MS.760 Paris.

Development

The Fleuret was designed and built to compete in an order for the French Air Force for a two-seat jet trainer. It was a side-by-side low mid-wing cantilever monoplane with a T-tail and powered by two 800 lbf (3.6kn) Turbomeca Marboré II turbojets. The prototype with French test registration F-ZWRS first flew on 29 January 1953. The aircraft was not ordered with the Air Force buying the Fouga CM.170 Magister instead and only one Fleuret was built.

The Fleuret II an enlarged four-seat development was designed and produced as the MS.760 Paris.

Indian Air Force Tests

In March 1954, the sole prototype MS.755 was disassembled, crated and shipped to Begumpet Air Force Station, India, for tropical weather and trainer-suitability trials with the Indian Air Force.

The audio memoirs of IAF Wing Commander Donald George Michael detail how Morane-Saulnier's Chief Test Pilot, Monsieur Jean Cliquet, and a team of 4 or 5 technicians accompanied the aircraft.

The assigned IAF senior pilots were impressed with the MS.755 as a trainer, and ran a series of flight instruction tests where low time students with only 10 hours total flying experience transitioned to the jet and soloed with no problems. This led to further tests where zero-time students were taught to fly on the MS.755, and later on the two-place DH Vampire.

During a flight early in the program, the two IAF senior pilots caused concern with Morane-Saulnier personnel when they pulled 8.5 Gs out of a dive. This was a significantly higher loading than the factory test pilots had reached. The engines were immediately replaced with spares and sent to France for analysis, but it was determined that no damage had taken place to either the engines or the airframe.

The IAF tests of the MS.755 ended in June 1954 and the aircraft was then crated and shipped back to France.

Specifications

See also

Notes

Bibliography

Further reading

1950s French military trainer aircraft
MS.755
Low-wing aircraft
Twinjets
T-tail aircraft
Aircraft first flown in 1953